Val-d'Or/Lac Stabell Water Aerodrome  is located on Lake Stabell,  north northwest of Val-d'Or, Quebec, Canada.

See also
 List of airports in the Val-d'Or area

References

Registered aerodromes in Abitibi-Témiscamingue
Val-d'Or
Seaplane bases in Quebec